Fled is the soundtrack to the 1996 action film Fled. It was released on July 15, 1996, by Arista Records and Rowdy Records and consisted mainly of hip hop and R&B music. The soundtrack reached No. 60 on the Billboard Top R&B/Hip-Hop Albums chart and featured the single "Touch Myself" by T-Boz which peaked at No. 40 on the Billboard Hot 100 and No. 23 on the Hot R&B/Hip-Hop Singles & Tracks chart.

Track listing
"Intro"- 1:40 (Big Rube)
"You Can't Run"- 4:32 (Royal C)
"Touch Myself"- 4:09 (T-Boz)
"Remember What I Said"- 5:13 (Goodie Mob)
"Bright Lights"- 2:58 (T. Smith)
"Word"- 3:18 (God's Gift to God)
"Missing You"- 4:30 (Monica)
"Highway"- 5:12 (Tony Rich)
"Magic in Your Eyes"- 3:54 (Joi)
"Spain"- 4:39 (Lou)
"Right Way"- 3:48 (For Real)
"Crank This"- 4:19 (DJ Kizzy Rock)
"Fled"- 4:29 (Fishbone)

References

Hip hop soundtracks
1996 soundtrack albums
1990s film soundtrack albums